The 1896–97 season was the first season that Tottenham Hotspur turned professional, where they competed in two leagues during the season. The Southern League and the United League. In the FA Cup Tottenham played three qualifying game and in the third went away to Luton where they lost 3–0. There were also a total of 26 recorded friendly games played that season.

Tottenham turned professional in order to join the Football League but were rejected having come bottom of a poll with just two votes. Instead the club were then elected to the Southern League.

Squad

Competitions

United League

Table

Results

Southern League

League table

Results

FA Cup

References

Tottenham Hotspur F.C. seasons
English football clubs 1896–97 season